The Department of Health (DOH) is the executive department of the government of the Philippines responsible for ensuring access to basic public health services by all Filipinos through the provision of quality health care, the regulation of all health services and products. It is the government's over-all technical authority on health. It has its headquarters at the San Lazaro Compound, along Rizal Avenue in Manila.

The head of the department is currently Maria Rosario Vergeire as the officer-in-charge and is nominated by the president of the Philippines and confirmed by the Commission on Appointments. The health secretary is a member of the Cabinet.

History
Americans assembled a military Board of Health on Sept. 10, 1898, with its formal organization on September 29. Upon its creation, Dr. Frank S. Bourns is assigned as president while Dr. C. L. Mullins is assigned as assistant surgeon. The purpose of this Board of Health was to care for injured American troops but as the hostilities between Filipinos and Americans waned in 1901, a civilian Board of Health was now deemed appropriate with Dr. L. M. Maus as the first health commissioner.

In the early 1900s, 200,222 lives including 66,000 children were lost; three percent of the population was decimated in the worst epidemic in Philippine health history. In view of this, the Americans organized and erected several institutions, including the Bureau of Governmental Laboratories, which was built in 1901 for medical research and vaccine production.

The Americans, led by Dean Worcester built the UP College of Medicine and Surgery in 1905, with Johns Hopkins University serving as a blueprint, at the time, one of the best medical schools in the world. By 1909, nursing instruction was also begun at the Philippine Normal School. In terms of public health, the Americans improved on the sewer system and provided a safer water supply.

In 1915, the Bureau of Health was reorganized and renamed into the Philippine Health Service. During the succeeding years leadership and a number of health institutions were already being given to Filipinos, in accordance with the Organic Act of 1916. On January 1, 1919, Dr. Vicente De Jesus became the first Filipino to head the Health portfolio.

In 1933, after a reorganization, the Philippine Health Service reverted to being known as the Bureau of Health. It was during this time that it pursued its official journal, The Health Messenger and established Community Health and Social Centers, precursors to today's Barangay Health Centers.

By 1936, as Governor-General Frank Murphy was assuming the post of United States High Commissioner, he would remark that the Philippines led all oriental countries in terms of health status.

When the Commonwealth of the Philippines was inaugurated, Dr. Jose F. Fabella was named chief of the Bureau of Health. In 1936, Dr. Fabella reviewed the Bureau of Health's organization and made an inventory of its existing facilities, which consisted of 11 community and social health centers, 38 hospitals, 215 puericulture centers, 374 sanitary divisions, 1,535 dispensaries and 72 laboratories.

In the 1940s, the Bureau of Health was reorganized into the Department of Health and Public Welfare, still under Fabella. During this time, the major priorities of the agency were tuberculosis, malnutrition, malaria, leprosy, gastrointestinal disease, and the high infant mortality rate.

When the Japanese occupied the Philippines, they dissolved the National Government and replaced it with the Central Administrative Organization of the Japanese Army. Health was relegated to the Department of Education, Health and Public Welfare under Commissioner Claro M. Recto.

In 1944, President Manuel Roxas signed Executive Order (E.O.) No. 94 into law, calling for the creation of the Department of Health. Dr. Antonio C. Villarama as appointed Secretary. A new Bureau of Hospitals and a Bureau of Quarantine was created under DOH. Under E.O. 94, the Institute of Nutrition was created in 1948 to coordinate various nutrition activities of the different agencies.

On February 20, 1958, Executive Order 288 provided for the reorganization of the Department of Health. This entailed a partial decentralization of powers and created eight Regional Health Offices. Under this setup, the Secretary of Health passed on some of responsibilities to the regional offices and directors.

One of the priorities of the Marcos administration was health maintenance. From 1975 to the mid-1980s, four specialty hospitals were built in succession. The first three institutions were spearheaded by First Lady Imelda Marcos. The Philippine Heart Center was established on February 14, 1975, with Dr. Avelino Aventura as director. Second, the Philippine Children's Medical Center was built in 1979. Then in 1983, the National Kidney and Transplant Institute was set up. This was soon followed by the Lung Center of the Philippines, which was constructed under the guidance of Health Minister Dr. Enrique Garcia.

With a shift to a parliamentary form of government, the Department of Health was transformed into the Ministry of Health on June 2, 1978, with Dr. Clemente S. Gatmaitan as the first health minister. On April 13, 1987, the Department of Health was created from the previous Ministry of Health with Dr. Alfredo R. A. Bengzon as secretary of health.

On December 17, 2016, Health Secretary Paulyn Jean Rossel-Ubial announced that in 2017 the government will start paying the hospital bills and medicines of poor Filipinos.  She said that the Department of Health (DOH) is capable of taking care of the hospital bills and medicines of poor Filipinos owing to its bigger budget starting in 2017.

A total of ₱96.336 billion was allocated to the DOH in the 2017 national budget, which includes funds for the construction of additional health facilities and drug rehabilitation centers. Ubial said poor patients in government hospitals do not even have to present Philhealth cards when they avail of assistance. She added that poor patients will no longer be billed by government hospitals.

Ubial said President Rodrigo Duterte is keen on implementing the program to help poor Filipinos in all parts of the country. She said Philhealth will remain a partner of government hospitals in serving the poor. [5]

Senator Loren Legarda, chair of the Senate committee on finance said that the proposed ₱3.35-trillion national budget for 2017 will provide healthcare assistance to all Filipinos, said an additional ₱3 billion was allocated to the Philippine Health Insurance Corporation (PhilHealth) to ensure coverage for all Filipinos.

“The Department of Health (DOH) said there are some eight million Filipinos still not covered by PhilHealth. It is our duty, in serving the public, to extend basic healthcare protection to all our people. That is why we pushed for the augmentation of the PhilHealth’s budget so that in 2017, we achieve universal healthcare coverage,” she said.

Legarda said universal healthcare coverage means that any non-member of PhilHealth will automatically be made a member upon availment of healthcare service in a public hospital.

Philippine government response to the COVID-19 pandemic (2020-2022) 
In early January 2020, the Philippines has confirmed the case of Novel coronavirus disease. However, in March, the Philippines went to national lockdowns, citing the beginning of stay-at-home orders, mask mandate, and with social distancing, while it was relatively successful in containing the virus. In February 2021, COVID-19 vaccines has reached the Philippines and began to the administrated.

The Department of Health was criticized after in a 2021 study saying that the Philippines was 2nd to the last in the world in terms by how effective the Philippine government did response to the pandemic. It was heavily criticized by DOH Secretary Francisco Duque III.

On 11 February 2022, COVID-19 response has officially ended in the Philippines that the country will likely becoming the transition from pandemic to the endemic phase until now.

List of Secretaries of Health

Organizational structure
At present, the department is headed by the Secretary of Health, with eight undersecretaries and eight assistant secretaries heading the following teams:

Office of the Secretary
Usec. Maria Rosario S. Vergeire, M.D., MPH, CESO II - Officer in Charge

Undersecretaries
Lilibeth C. David, M.D., MPH, MPM, CESO I - Health Policy and Infrastructure Development Team
Ma. Carolina Vidal-Taino, CPA, MGM, CESO I - Management Services Team
Abdullah B. Dumama Jr., M.D., MPA, CESO I - Mindanao Field Implementation and Coordination Team
Police Gen. Camilo Pancratius P. Cascolan (Ret.), MPM, CESE - Visayas Field Implementaion and Coordination Team
Kenneth G. Ronquillo, M.D., MPHM, CESO III - Health Policy and Infrastructure Development Team
Nestor F. Santiago Jr., M.D., MPHC, MHSA, CESO II - NCR and Luzon Field Implementation and Coordination Team
Maria Francia Miciano-Laxamana, M.D., MHSA, CHS - Office of Special Concerns

Assistant Secretaries
Beverly Lorraine C. Ho, M.D., MPH - Assistant Secretary for Public Health Services Team and OIC-Undersecretary
Atty. Charade B. Mercado-Grande, MPSA - Assistant Secretary for Health Regulation Team and OIC-Undersecretary
Maylene M. Beltran, MPA, CESO III - Management Services Team
Atty. Frances Mae Cherryl K. Ontalan - Office of the Secretary

Unit offices
The DOH is composed of bureaus, services & program offices, under the following teams

Administration and Financial Management Team
 Administrative Service
Finance Management Service
 Malasakit Program Office
Field Implementation and Coordination Team
Ilocos Center for Health Development
Cagayan Valley Center for Health Development
Central Luzon Center for Health Development
Calabarzon Center for Health Development
Mimaropa Center for Health Development
Bicol Center for Health Development
Western Visayas Center for Health Development
Central Visayas Center for Health Development
Eastern Visayas Center for Health Development
Zamboanga Peninsula Center for Health Development
Northern Mindanao Center for Health Development
Davao Center for Health Development
Soccsksargen Center for Health Development
Caraga Center for Health Development
Cordillera Center for Health Development
Metro Manila Center for Health Development
Bangsamoro Ministry of Health
 Health Facilities and Infrastructure Development Team
Health Facilities Development Bureau (formerly National Center For Health Facilities Development)
Health Facilities Enhancement Program
 Knowledge Management & Information Service
 Dangerous Drugs Abuse Prevention and Treatment Program
 Office of Health Laboratories
Health Policy and Systems Development Team
 Bureau of International Health Cooperation
 Bureau of Local Health Systems Development
 Health Human Resource Development Bureau
 Health Policy Development and Planning Bureau
Health Regulation Team
 Bureau of Quarantine
Health Facilities and Services Regulatory Bureau
Pharmaceutical Division
Office of the Chief of Staff
 Internal Audit Service
 Legal Service
 Procurement and Supply Chain Management Team
 Procurement Service
Supply Chain Management Service
 Public Health Services Team
 Disease Prevention and Control Bureau
Epidemiology Bureau (formerly National Epidemiology Center)
 Health Promotion and Communication Service
 Health Emergency Management Bureau

Attached agencies and hospitals

Attached agencies
The following agencies and councils are attached to the DOH for policy and program coordination:
Food and Drug Administration (FDA)
National Nutrition Council (NNC)
Philippine Health Insurance Corporation (PHIC; PhilHealth)
Philippine Institute for Traditional and Alternative Health Care (PITAHC)
Philippine National AIDS Council (PNAC)

Retained hospitals
The following hospitals are directly under the DOH:

Statistics

Budget

References

 
Health
Philippines
Philippines, Health